Tectus fenestratus, common name the fenestrate top shell or the latticed top shell, is a species of sea snail, a marine gastropod mollusk in the family Tegulidae.

Description
The size of the shell varies between 17 mm and 50 mm. The imperforate, solid shell has a conic shape. It is, white or grayish, mottled and maculated with green, brown or olive. The base of the shell is unicolored, white. The apex is acute. The shell contains 9-11 whorls . The apical ones are smooth by erosion, the following armed around the lower margin with radiating squamose or (on the body whorl) solid tubercles, which are usually laterally compressed on the lower whorls, and number 12 to 20 on the body whorl. The entire surface above the periphery is covered with fine oblique wrinkles, which are more or less beaded by a few (3 to 5) revolving lirae. The; base of the shell is flat, concentrically lirate, the lirae 8 to 14 in number.  The outer lirae are crenulated by fine radiating wrinkles which are continued a short distance inward from the periphery. The aperture is transverse. The outer and parietal walls are lirate within, the base more or less strongly uni-lamellate. The columella contains a strong downward directed acute fold.

This species is a variable form, which, however may be readily recognized by the sutural knobs and secondary sculpture of fine wrinkles above, and by the crenulated or beaded line around the outer edge of the base.

Distribution
This marine species occurs in the Central and West Pacific Ocean, Indo-China, Indo-Malaysia, and off  Papua New Guinea,  New Caledonia and Australia (Northern Territory, Queensland, Western Australia).

References

 Brazier, J. 1877. Continuation of the Mollusca collected during the Chevert Expedition. Proceedings of the Linnean Society of New South Wales 2: 41-53 
 Troschel, F.H. 1879. Das Gebiss der Schnecken, zur Begründung einer Natürlichen Classification [by J. Thiele, written after Troschel's death]. Berlin : Nicolaische Verlagsbuchhandlung Vol. II 237 pp.
 Melvill, J.C. & Standen, R. 1899. Report on the marine Mollusca obtained during the first expedition of Prof. A.C. Haddon to the Torres Straits in 1888-89. Journal of the Linnean Society of London, Zoology 27: 150-206, pls 1-2 
 Hedley, C. 1907. The Mollusca of Mast Head Reef, Capricorn Group, Queensland, part II. Proceedings of the Linnean Society of New South Wales 32: 476-513, pls 16-21
 Schepman, M.M. 1908. Prosobranchia (excluding Heteropoda and parasitic Prosobranchia). Rhipidoglossa and Docoglossa. With an appendix by Prof. R. Bergh [Pectinobranchiata]. Siboga-Expéditie Report 49(1): 1-108, 9 pls
 Odhner, N.H. 1917. Results of Dr E. Mjöbergs Swedish scientific expeditions to Australia. 1910-1913, pt XVII, Mollusca. Kongliga Svenska Vetenskaps-Academiens Nya Handlingar, Stockholm 52(16): 1-115 pls 1-3 
 Cossmann, M. 1918. Essais de Paléoconchologie comparée. Paris : private publication Vol. 11 307 pp., pl. X, figs 19-20.
 Hedley, C. 1916. A preliminary index of the Mollusca of Western Australia. Journal and Proceedings of the Royal Society of Western Australia 1: 152-226
 Oostingh, C.H. 1925. Report on a collection of recent shells from Obi and Halmahera, Molluccas. Mededeelingen van de Landbouwhoogeschool te Wageningen 29(1): 1-362 
 Allan, J.K. 1950. Australian Shells: with related animals living in the sea, in freshwater and on the land. Melbourne : Georgian House xix, 470 pp., 45 pls, 112 text figs
 Altena, C.O. van 1950. The marine Mollusca of the Kendeng Beds (East Java) Gastropoda. Part 5 (Families Muricidae-Volemidae inclusive). Leidsche Geologische Mededelingen 15: 205-240
 Rippingale, O.H. & McMichael, D.F. 1961. Queensland and Great Barrier Reef Shells. Brisbane : Jacaranda Press 210 pp.
 Hinton, A. 1972. Shells of New Guinea and the Central Indo-Pacific. Milton : Jacaranda Press xviii 94 pp.
 Wells, F.E. & Bryce, C.W. 1986. Seashells of Western Australia. Perth : Western Australian Museum 207 pp.
 Wilson, B. 1993. Australian Marine Shells. Prosobranch Gastropods. Kallaroo, Western Australia : Odyssey Publishing Vol. 1 408 pp
 Dekker, H. & Orlin Z. 2000. Checklist of Red Sea Mollusca. Spirula 47(Supplement): 1-46

External links
 To GenBank (3 nucleotides; 1 proteins)
 To USNM Invertebrate Zoology Mollusca Collection
 To World Register of Marine Species
 

fenestratus
Gastropods described in 1791